Ottavio Ridolfi (1582–1624) was a Roman Catholic cardinal.

On 21 Oct 1612, he was consecrated bishop by Giovanni Garzia Mellini, Cardinal-Priest of Santi Quattro Coronati, with Alessandro Ludovisi, Archbishop of Bologna, and Lorenzo Landi, Bishop of Fossombrone, serving as co-consecrators.

Episcopal succession
While bishop, he was the principal co-consecrator of:
Camillo Moro, Bishop of Termoli (1612);
Luigi Capponi, Archbishop of Ravenna (1621); and 
Ludovico Ludovisi, Archbishop of Bologna (1621).

References

1582 births
1624 deaths
17th-century Italian cardinals
17th-century Italian Roman Catholic bishops
17th-century Roman Catholic bishops in Sicily